Baker's Falls is a famous waterfall in Sri Lanka. It is located in the Horton Plains National Park, on a tributary of the Belihul Oya.

The falls were named after British explorer and big game hunter, Sir Samuel Baker. Many Rhododendron and Fern bushes can be seen around the waterfall.

See also
 List of waterfalls of Sri Lanka

Citations

Notes

References

External links 

Waterfalls in Central Province, Sri Lanka
Tourist attractions in Central Province, Sri Lanka
Geography of Nuwara Eliya District